The Jakarta Standard Tag Library (JSTL; formerly JavaServer Pages Standard Tag Library) is a component of the Java EE Web application development platform. It extends the JSP specification by adding a tag library of JSP tags for common tasks, such as XML data processing, conditional execution, database access, loops and internationalization.

JSTL was developed under the Java Community Process (JCP) as Java Specification Request (JSR) 52. On May 8, 2006, JSTL 1.2 was released, followed by JSTL 1.2.1 on Dec 7, 2011.

JSTL provides an effective way to embed logic within a JSP page without using embedded Java code directly. The use of a standardized tag set, rather than breaking in and out of Java code, leads to more maintainable code and enables separation of concerns between the development of the application code and user interface.

There are a total of six JSTL tag library descriptors:
 Core library. E.g.  and 
 i18n-capable formatting library
 * Database tag library, contains tags for querying, creating and updating database table.
 XML library
 functions library
 TLVs allow translation-time validation of the XML view of a JSP page. The TLVs provided by JSTL allow tag library authors to enforce restrictions regarding the use of scripting elements and permitted tag libraries in JSP pages.

In addition to JSTL, the JCP has the following JSRs to develop standard JSP tag libraries:
 JSR 128: JESI – JSP Tag Library for Edge Side Includes (inactive)
 JSR 267: JSP Tag Library for Web Services

See also 
 Unified Expression Language

References

External links 
 
 JSTL TLDDocs
 JSR 52 (JSTL 1.0, 1.1, and 1.2)
 Jakarta Standard Taglib 1.1, an implementation of JSTL (retired)
 Apache Standard Taglib an implementation of the JSP Standard Tag Library (JSTL) specification
 JSTL 1.0 Referenz (German) 
 JSTL 1.2 home page
 Official Tutorial: The Java EE 5 Tutorial, Chapter 7, JavaServer Pages Standard Tag Library
 JSTL 1.1 References
 JSF 2.1 Facelets Tag Library Documentation
 OWASP ESAPI Tags (as JSTL does not offer any tags for website security)

Java enterprise platform
Java specification requests